Hou Ching-shan or Javier Hou is a Taiwanese politician. He was the Deputy Minister of Foreign Affairs in 2015–2018.

Education
Hou obtained his bachelor's degree in Spanish language and literature from Fu Jen Catholic University in 1972, and his master's in literature and philology and doctorate in philology from Complutense University of Madrid in Spain in 1975 and 1978, respectively.

Ministry of Foreign Affairs

Central America visit
Hou and delegates accompanied President Chen Shui-bian for an official visit to Honduras, El Salvador and Nicaragua in August 2007.

São Tomé and Príncipe diplomatic cut
After São Tomé and Príncipe cut diplomatic relation with the ROC on 21 December 2016, Hou said that ROC relation with one of its other diplomatic ally is in yellow caution light, but he declined to comment which country it was.

See also
 Executive Yuan

References

Living people
Representatives of Taiwan to Spain
Taiwanese Ministers of Foreign Affairs
Year of birth missing (living people)